M-Seq is an EP by French house musician Mr. Oizo, released in 1998 on CD and 12" vinyl.

Track listing

12"
A1. Intro (Kirk's back) (2:00)
A2. M-Seq (5:25)
A3. Shortkut (2:30)
B1. Tweeter Trouble (5:40)
B2. Oizo's (Doggy Bag Mix) (3:48)

CD
1. Intro (Kirk’s Back) (2:00)
2. M-Seq (5:25)
3. Shortkut (2:30)
4. Tweeter Trouble (5:40)
5. Oizo’s (Doggy Bag Mix) (3:48)
6. Breakdown (5:30)

1997 EPs
Mr. Oizo albums